or  are the common names for a small sized variety of Japanese citrus, whose rind is of a characteristic "golden" bright yellow color.

The variety has been published as the species Citrus flaviculpus by Chōzaburō Tanaka in his 160-species scheme, but this is considered an effort of a "splitter", as opposed to Swingle's classification system which is generally preferred in the West.

Alternate spellings (romanizations) include "Ougonkan" or "Ogon-kan". It has also been called "Golden orange" in Kanagawa Prefecture.

History 
The variety has long been known in Kagoshima Prefecture as  but, precise origins are unknown.

According to one assertion, it has been known in Higashi-ichiki-chō (ja) and its neighborhood (now Hioki, Kagoshima) since the Meiji Period. Anecdotally in this Hioki area, the variety is said to have been either introduced by the Jesuit Francisco de Xavier, or brought back from the Korean Peninsula during Hideyoshi's invasions of Korea in the late 16th century. It has been suggested that the name "Ōgonkan" was dubbed by  who introduced the variety to Ehime Prefecture, but this too is poorly documented.

Fruit 
The rind, which is bright yellow, can be peeled by hand but with difficulty. It has a distinct fragrance, and a considerably sweet flavour, with some balancing acidity. The fruit is harvested from February to April. Seedless (self-incompatibility) traits have been observed.

Its fragrance is similar to the Hyuganatsu, a larger citrus that is also bright yellow, but somewhat sweeter by comparison. Like the Hyuganatsu, the white pith (albedo) may be eaten.

The rind's cold-pressed oil has been studied for fragrance factors, and was found to contain limonene (roughly 80%), followed by the monoterpene Gamma-terpinene (10%), trans beta-farnesene, and myrcene, showing similarity to Hyuganatsu's peel profile, though with quantitative differences in concentrations.

Regional production 
According to government (MAFF) statistics for FY2010, crop yield of the Ōgonkan totaled 137.3 t (metric tons) in all of Japan, with 108.2 t shipped to market, none of it classed as processed goods (i.e., juices, etc.) in the statistics. Kanagawa Prefecture produced 93.4 t, representing 68% of the national total, followed by Shizuoka Prefecture with 25.0 t (18％), Ehime Prefecture with 13.9 t, and Kōchi Prefecture with 5.0 t. Major cultivating areas listed are Odawara and Yugawara-cho (Kanagawa pref.), Numazu, Shizuoka, Uwajima, Seiyo, Imabari (Ehime pref.), and Kōnan, Kōchi.

Hybrid crossing 
The Ōgonkan was the pollinating parent for the hybrid cultivar  developed by Ehime Prefecture, and was the seed parent of Shonan Gold developed by Kanagawa Prefecture.

See also 
 Mikan

Notes

References 

山本雅史, 久保達也, 冨永茂人, 「カンキツにおける自家および交雑不和合性」 園芸学会雑誌 75巻5号(2006年)
In Japanese with English abstracts
 (w/English title and abstract) Agriknowledge (with PDF link); Agri-kanagawa (pdf)
 =
, JGLOBAL ID:200902281400290696, (pdf)
 =

External links 
 Registration kind database (MAFF cultivar registration database. Available in English with limited information.

Citrus
Food plant cultivars
Fruits originating in East Asia
Japanese fruit